Sardrud District is a district (bakhsh) in Razan County, Hamadan Province, Iran. At the 2006 census, its population was 38,719, in 8,646 families.  The District has one city: Damaq.  The District has three rural districts (dehestan): Boghrati Rural District, Sardrud-e Olya Rural District, and Sardrud-e Sofla Rural District.

References 

Razan County
Districts of Hamadan Province